Sar Cheshmeh (also Romanized as Sar Chashmeh) is a village in Layl Rural District, in the Central District of Lahijan County, Gilan Province, Iran. At the 2006 census, its population was 382, in 126 families.

References 

Populated places in Lahijan County